Ugra may refer to:
Ugra, the pen-name of the Indian writer Pandey Becham Sharma (1907–1967)
Ugra (Oka), a river in Russia, tributary of the Oka
Ugra, a small river in Romania, tributary of the Trotuș
Ugra, the Hungarian name for Ungra Commune, Brașov County, Romania
Ugra, a Hungarian name for Ogra Commune, Mureș County, Romania
Ugra (inhabited locality), several inhabited localities in Russia
Ugra National Park, a national park in Russia
Ugra-class submarine tenders, the NATO classification of a ship from the Soviet Navy
Upper Guadalupe River Authority, a government-owned corporation in Texas, United States
Ugraparipṛcchā Sūtra, also known as The Inquiry of Ugra
Unitized Group Ration - A (UGR-A), a type of American military ration

See also
Yugra